Margesson is a surname. Notable people with the surname include:

Peter Somerset Margesson Judd DL (born 1949), the current Dean of Chelmsford
David Margesson, 1st Viscount Margesson PC (1890–1965), British Conservative politician
Viscount Margesson, a title in the Peerage of the United Kingdom

See also
Margon (disambiguation)
Marson
Masson (disambiguation)